Dent de Burgin is a mountain near the Meribel resort in Savoie, France. It lies in the Vanoise range. It has an altitude of 2739 meters above sea level.

References

Mountains of the Alps
Mountains of Savoie